DayZ is a multiplayer-only survival video game developed and published by Bohemia Interactive. It is the standalone game based on the mod of the same name for ARMA 2. Following a five-year-long early access period for Windows, the game was officially released in December 2018, and was released for the Xbox One and PlayStation 4 in 2019.

The game places the player in the fictional post-Soviet Republic of Chernarus, the original setting of ARMA 2, where a mysterious plague has turned most of the population into violent "infected". As a survivor, the player must scavenge the world for food, water, weapons and medicine, while killing or avoiding the infected, and killing, avoiding, or cooperating with other players in an effort to survive the outbreak.

DayZ began development in 2012 when the mod's creator, Dean Hall, joined Bohemia Interactive to commence work on the standalone version of the game. The development has been focused on altering the engine to suit the game's needs, developing a working client-server architecture, and introducing new features like diseases and a better inventory system. The game sold over three million copies during its early access phase.

Gameplay
The goal of DayZ is to stay alive and healthy during the conditions of the zombie outbreak that have befallen the in-game world. The player begins equipped with only simple clothes, a glow stick and half of a bandage, and must begin exploring the large  landscape of the fictional former Soviet Republic of Chernarus to investigate locations such as houses, barns, and apartments to scavenge supplies. These supplies include food and water, which are basic keys to prolonging the player's life. Beyond the basics of survival, players can find various forms of clothing, which allow customization, extra storage space for supplies, and warmth. Also scattered around the map are a variety of weapons, allowing players to protect themselves from zombies, and other players if necessary. These are largely focused on a range of melee weapons, but a number of firearms are present, along with attachments such as suppressors and telescopic sights. Additionally, the game features gas attacks, which launch a deadly gas, causing the player to bleed and vomit, eventually resulting in unconsciousness and death, unless they leave this zone and find suitable medical treatment. Characters may use an NBC suit and gas mask to prevent damage. Player interaction is a major part of DayZ gameplay. The game provides proximity voice chat and text chat. It also provides in-game gestures, such as waving, or putting hands up to indicate surrender.

While travelling the map, players can also find various medical supplies as the environment poses a range of threats to their characters. Planned features include diseases such as cholera, dysentery and hepatitis, which can be caught by ingesting dirty water or rotten food, and must be cured with appropriate medicines. If a player is shot or injured, items on their person may be damaged. When bleeding, the player must be bandaged quickly to minimize blood loss; excessive damage or blood loss will result in serious deterioration of vision and can render them unconscious.

Planned features of the game include being able to build bases in the world in which players can keep their items safe, with the possibility of security systems and programmable computers having been considered. The standalone game will build on the text and close range voice chat of the mod version by including a new whisper channel, which will allow players to communicate over a very short distance without players nearby hearing, as well as radios, which will allow longer range communication, including the possibility of encrypted two-way radios and player-run radio stations. A number of features have been added to the release, including hunting animals and cooking.

Development

Following the huge successes of the DayZ mod, Dean Hall announced in a August 2012 development blog that DayZ would begin development as a standalone game, in conjunction with Bohemia Interactive and himself as project lead. He said that the game needed to be released before the end of the year "in order to achieve what we have to do", and that he wanted an initial release around November 2012. The game will be running on a branch of the Take On Helicopters engine (part of the Real Virtuality engine), and the main areas of developmental focus would be "critical issues", such as bug fixing, hacking, and security.

One of the developmental focuses was making the world feel more realistic by increasing the number of enterable buildings. Hall stated that he hopes to implement bad ideas into the game, in order to find what players enjoy, rather than taking no risks at all. The game is based on a client-server architecture, where functions such as item and NPC spawning are decided on the server, rather than on the player's machine. This is in contrast to the DayZ mod in ARMA 2, which had a large proportion of these tasks performed on the client. By doing so, this change aims to reduce the number of hacks and exploits available. The new engine would also allow removal of unnecessary functions from ARMA 2, such as AI flanking. It was announced in November that the game would be released via digital distribution software Steam, allowing use of the Steam server browser and patching functionality.

Following the troubled release of similar game The War Z, Hall stated in a post on Reddit that the "whole 'saga' of the development made me seriously question if I wanted to be involved in the industry" and that he had considered leaving the DayZ standalone project. Screaming like a little girl once he left the dev team in shambles.  The game missed its original 2012 release date, with a development update coming in January 2013 saying that the game was not yet released because the developers "had the chance to go from making a game that was just the mod improved slightly... to actually redeveloping the engine and making the game the way we all dreamed it could be." The release date was rescheduled and an internal closed test began on the game, with it being announced that public testing would not be taking place until the server architecture was finalized.

In June 2013, Hall commented that the alpha release of the game would be a "very bare-bones" alpha in which the development team want a relatively low number of players providing bug reports and feedback. The secondary aim of the initial alpha release is to keep the project funded for further development until the full release. Hall has stated that he expects the beta release to be at least a year after that of the alpha. The last tasks prior to the alpha release were network optimizations, referred to as a 'network bubble', which would reduce network load on the player by only loading events which occur within their vicinity. In October, Hall stated that the development team was on the final lap of development and that the team was "100 percent focused on getting the alpha out the door." After release the developers are focusing on server performance and stability, adding extra features such as animals and vehicles, and improving the controls and animations, among other things.

Throughout the game's development Hall has posted development blogs, attended video game conventions, and uploaded gameplay videos, keeping the community up to date with the development progress. The second development video showed the animation team in a motion capture session recording new animations, as well as some interviews with the development team and the third contained a large amount of in-game footage, showing new clothing items and a new area of the map.

In March 2014, Dean Hall revealed that Bohemia Interactive had purchased a new development team, Cauldron Studios, whose 25 developers would be added to the DayZ development team. At Gamescom 2014, DayZ was confirmed for the PS4 console with a release date to be determined. During E3 2015, the Xbox One version of the game was announced. Steam Workshop support, which grants players access to host servers, and a single-player mode of the game was also announced and will be added to the game in the future.

In 2022, two UK production companies bought the film rights to create a feature film adaptation of the zombie survival video game.

Release
The first publicly available development build was released on December 16, 2013, during the alpha development stage through Steam's Early Access program at a cheaper price than when it is finally released. The price will increase as development continues until reaching the full release price. This alpha release is an early access build with a large amount of the features still in progress and the development team is targeting the release at an audience who want to be involved in what Hall called a "very barebones experience that is a platform for future development." At Gamescom 2018, it was revealed that game would be released on the Xbox One's Xbox Game Preview on August 29, 2018. DayZ was officially released out of early access for Windows on December 13, 2018, and for the PlayStation 4 and Xbox One in early 2019.

Reception

The alpha release sold over 172,500 copies in the first 24 hours, totalling over 5 million in sales. During peak sales, over 200 copies were being purchased per minute and after one week over 400,000 copies had been sold. The game reached a total of more than a million sales while remaining at the top of Steam's sales charts for two weeks in a row. In an alpha review of DayZ, Rick Lane of Eurogamer commented positively on the new additions but said that the game may not be worth the current price until more features have been added. On the other hand, Craig Pearson of PC Gamer said that he had good experiences in DayZ and that it was already worth the price.

By May 2014, the game had sold over two million copies. increasing to over four million by November 2018. In April 2022 Dayz has beaten its all-time peak player record, 50,000 Player Count, Veterans questioning why people would fall into such a trap, despite negative reviews from almost every critic. In August 2019, the game was briefly banned in Australia due to "illicit or proscribed drug use related to incentives or rewards", derived from one of the game's options to restore health being a cannabis joint. This option was not officially in-game, and it was only available via community-made mods. The ban was eventually lifted after Bohemia edited the game in order to fully comply with the Australian Classification Board.

Awards
DayZ won the MMORPG.com award for Best Hybrid MMO at PAX East 2013, and it was announced as the winner of IGN's People's Choice Award of Gamescom 2013, beating 49 other games with 15% of the votes. At the 2014 Golden Joystick Awards DayZ won the Best Indie Game and Best Original Game awards.

References

External links
 

2018 video games
Bohemia Interactive games
First-person shooter multiplayer online games
Multiplayer and single-player video games
Open-world video games
PlayStation 4 games
Survival video games
Tactical shooter video games
Third-person shooters
Video games about viral outbreaks
Video games featuring protagonists of selectable gender
Video games developed in the Czech Republic
Windows games
Xbox Cloud Gaming games
Xbox One games
Video games about zombies
Video game controversies
Video games set in Europe